Daocheng County or Dapba in Tibetan, historically Daoba, is a county of western Sichuan Province, China, located in the eastern Hengduan Mountains. It is under the administration of the Garzê Tibetan Autonomous Prefecture with an overwhelmingly Tibetan population.

Daocheng Yading Airport, the world's highest airport, is located in Daocheng County.

History
The explorer Joseph Rock departed from Lijiang in 1928 and visited Daocheng.

After the fall of the Qing dynasty, Xiangcheng and Daocheng fell into chaos. Daocheng was controlled by local chiefs centered in Daoba and the Kongkaling region from 1930s to 1950s.

Administrative Divisions
Four towns:
 Jinzhu, Xianggelila, Sangdui, Jiga

Ten townships:
 Shengmu, Banghe, Sela, Julong, Dengpo/Dengbo ( / ), Mula, Chitu, Mengzi, Geka, Eyatong

Climate
Daocheng has a Monsoon-influenced warm-summer humid continental climate (Dwb) according to the Köppen Climate classification, with humid and rainy and warm summers, and cold and dry winters due to the high pressure that forms over the Tibetan Plateau during those months. Snowfall is most common during spring and autumn, as there is little precipitation during winter.

References

External links

Populated places in the Garzê Tibetan Autonomous Prefecture
County-level divisions of Sichuan